Jessie Smith (November 28, 1941 – February 4, 2021) was an American R&B vocalist. She began her career singing with musician Benny Sharp, recording as Little Miss Jessie, and became best known as one of the original Ikettes in the Ike & Tina Turner Revue. She later sang backing vocals for various artists, including Dr. John, Paul Williams, Al Kooper, José Feliciano, and Leon Ware.

Life and career 

Jessie Smith was born in Clarksdale, Mississippi, the daughter of Georgia and Israel Smith, and was raised in Alton, Illinois. She was a member of the Belle Street Temple Church Of God In Christ, under the leadership of Superintendent R.J. Monroe, and sang gospel solos and with choirs as a teenager. She was a part of The Monroe-Ettes, a female gospel group, with Missionary Norma Smith and Wanda Thompson.

After winning a local talent show at the age of 16, she occasionally sang background vocals for such visiting musicians as Albert King and Ike Turner.  In 1961, she was recruited by bandleader Benny Sharp and his band the Zorros of Rhythm in St. Louis. Sharp's band included New Breed, a vocal trio consisting of Stacy Johnson, Vernon Guy, and Horise O'Toole. Backed by Sharp and his band, Smith released the single, "My Baby Has Gone" / "St. Louis Sunset Twist," on Chicago's Mel-O Records under the name Little Miss Jessie in 1961.

By 1962, Smith, Johnson, and Guy had left Sharp to join the Ike & Tina Turner Revue which had relocated to Los Angeles. Smith along with Robbie Montgomery who she knew from St. Louis and Venetta Fields (a gospel singer from Buffalo, New York) formed the first official incarnation of the Ikettes. The revue toured throughout the country performing a grueling schedule of one-nighters. They performed at prominent venues such as the Apollo Theater in New York, the Howard Theatre in Washington, D.C., and the Uptown Theater in Philadelphia. As an Ikette, Smith performed on the American television shows American Bandstand, Hollywood A Go-Go, and Shindig!. Two of the Ikettes' biggest hits were released on Modern Records in 1965, "Peaches 'N' Cream" (Pop No. 36, R&B No. 28) and "I'm So Thankful" (Pop No. 74, R&B No. 12).

Smith, Fields and Montgomery left the revue in 1965. Prevented by Turner from using the name Ikettes, they formed the Mirettes in 1966, named after their new label Mirwood Records. They released a few singles, including "In the Midnight Hour" (Pop No. 45, R&B No. 18) in 1968. After they disbanded, Smith continued to record as a backing vocalist in the 1970s, with singers including Al Kooper, Bryan Ferry, and Jose Feliciano. On occasion she teamed up with Robbie Montgomery for sessions, such as the recording of Dr. John's albums In The Right Place (1973), Triumvirate, (1973), and Desitively Bonnaroo (1974).

After her R&B career, she settled in California, married Edward Lucas, and raised her family. In 1990, she returned to her gospel roots at the Monroe Memorial Church in Alton, Illinois, under Bishop Samuel E. White, where she continued to sing.

She died on February 4, 2021, aged 79.

Discography

Singles 

 1961: "My Baby Has Gone" / "St. Louis Sunset Twist: (Mel-O 101)
 1973: "When Love Calls Your Name" (with Mickey Stevenson) / "Please Go" (GSF 6899)

Albums featured as an Ikette/Mirette 

 1965: Live! The Ike & Tina Turner Show
 1967: The Ike & Tina Turner Show (Vol. 2)
 1966: Soul The Hits (Modern Records)
 1968: In The Midnight Hour (Revue Records)
 1969: Whirlpool (Uni Records)
 2004: The Bad Man: Rare & Unreissued Ike Turner Produced Recordings 1962-1965 (Night Train International)
 2012: Ike Turner Studio Productions: New Orleans and Los Angeles 1963–1965 (Ace Records)

Backing vocal credits 

 1971: Al Kooper – New York City (You're a Woman)
 1973: Bryan Ferry – These Foolish Things
 1973: Dr. John – In the Right Place
 1973: Mike Bloomfield / John Paul Hammond / Dr. John – Triumvirate
 1973: Gloria Jones – Share My Love
 1974: Badger – White Lady
 1974: Dr. John – Desitively Bonnaroo
 1974: José Feliciano – Compartments
 1974: Paul Williams – A Little Bit of Love
 1975: Johnny Bristol – Feeling the Magic
 1976: Leon Ware – Musical Massage

References

External links 
 Jessie Smith on AllMusic

1941 births
2021 deaths
21st-century African-American women singers
American gospel singers
American rhythm and blues singers
American soul singers
Ike & Tina Turner members
People from Alton, Illinois
Musicians from Clarksdale, Mississippi